Ryan Luis Verzosa Singson (born June 1, 1980) is a Filipino politician currently serving as the Vice Governor of Ilocos Sur since 2022. He previously served as Governor from 2013 to 2022 and representative of the 1st district of Ilocos Sur from 2011 to 2013.

Background
Singson was born on June 1, 1980 in the province of Ilocos Sur in the Philippines.

Singson was first elected into politics as representative of the 1st district of Ilocos Sur through a special election in 2011, replacing his brother Ronald, who resigned after having been convicted of drug possession in Hong Kong. He chose not to seek re-election for Congress in 2013 as he chose to run instead for governor of Ilocos Sur; he was successfully elected governor.

On July 24, 2016 during the election of officers of the provincial chief executives, Ryan Luis Singson was proclaimed as the new president of League of Provinces of the Philippines. 

After its presidential position in League of Provinces of the Philippines for about three years, he is now succeeded by Marinduque Governor Presbitero Velasco Jr. as the new president of LPP and a former Associate Justice of the Supreme Court of the Philippines. He is one of the child brothers of former Ilocos Sur Governor Chavit Singson, while his brother Ronald Singson is an incumbent member of House of Representatives of the Philippines.

References

1980 births
Governors of Ilocos Sur
People from Ilocos Sur
Living people
Lakas–CMD politicians